Used in centrifugal impeller terminology, bladelets are the more 'Metro' version of the common engineering description of splitters (shorter blades that do not extend into the centre of the impeller). The term is thought to have originated among the middle-upper-level management at medical device engineering companies, near the turn of the millennium.

Marine propulsion